Maria de la Salut is a small town and municipality located in the center of the island in the district of es pla on Majorca and in the northeast of the capital, one of the Balearic Islands, Spain. It borders on the municipalities of Llubí, Santa Margalida, Ariany and Sineu.

History
At the time of the Christian conquest, Maria's lands included the Murūh Islamic district. In the cast, it fell to the part of the Count of Empúries.

The municipality of Maria de la Salut appeared in the nineteenth century when it segregated from Santa Margalida.

They emphasize the "possessions" of Roqueta, Deulosal and Montblanc, as well as other estates and places such as sa Bisbal, Son Gil, es Pujol, es Rafal, Son Perot, es Gassons, sa Font, Son Roig, ses Sors, es Rafal Nou, sa Torreta, Son Niell, Llampí, Son Xigala, Vall d'Aram, Ses Tarragones and Son Bacs.

Economy
Traditionally it is an agricultural town where the extensive herbaceous crops and the ovine cattle ranch stand out; As well as garlic, melons, watermelons and tomatoes (which are often produced in rainfeed land); And in marginal areas, the almond trees.

In the last years several companies dedicated to the construction have already proliferated, either construction materials (mainly blockades and other prefabricated ones) as public and civil works.

There have been, and still exist, craftsmen of wood and iron.

They emphasize like other habitual trades, in number those of teachers and professors

Notable people
 Antoni Gelabert Mas, Professor of Urology at the Autonomous University of Barcelona; Head of the Urology Department at the Hospital del Mar in Barcelona and member of the Royal Academy of Medicine (Spain). 
 Antoni Mas Mas, outstanding member of MLN-Tupamaros in Uruguay.
 Julià Font i Roig, Dominican friar.

See also 

List of monuments and places of interest Maria de la Salut

References

External links 
 
 Page of the City Council
 Estatistics
 Guia de Mallorca: Maria de la Salut
 Diario de Mallorca Antoni Gelabert Mas

Municipalities in Mallorca
Populated places in Mallorca